The Alliance for Lobbying Transparency is a UK-based organisation formed in September 2007 and formally launched in January 2008  and concerned with the influence of lobbying on government decision-making.

The Alliance is also campaigning for a mandatory lobbyists register, while the UK Public Affairs Council is a lobby industry body supporting self-regulation. The UKPAC published its first register in March 2011 and the Alliance was immediately critical, saying an estimated 85-90% of lobbyists were shunning it, and highlighting condemnation by Austin Mitchell MP and others.

Members
Alliance members include charities, campaign groups and a trade union.
Action Aid
Campaign Against Arms Trade
Campaign for Press and Broadcasting Freedom
Corporate Watch
enough'senough.org 
Friends of the Earth
Greenpeace
National Union of Journalists
Pesticide Action Network
Platform
SPEAK network
SpinWatch (SpinWatch's director Tamasin Cave is sometimes quoted as head of the Alliance for Lobbying Transparency)
Unlock Democracy 
War on Want
World Development Movement

Some Alliance members are also supporters of a related European initiative, the Alliance for Lobbying Transparency and Ethics Regulation (ALTER-EU), a coalition concerned with corporate lobbyists' influence on the political agenda in Europe.

Funding
The Alliance has received funding via a grant from the Joseph Rowntree Charitable Trust's Power and Responsibility programme, and gets support from coalition members.

References

External link

ALTER-EU

Political advocacy groups in the United Kingdom
2007 establishments in England
Lobbying in the United Kingdom
2007 establishments in the United Kingdom
Organizations established in 2007